Jae-sung, also spelled Jae-seong, is a Korean masculine given name. Its meaning depends on the hanja used to write each syllable of the name.  There are 20 hanja with the reading "jae" and 27 hanja with the reading "seong" on the South Korean government's official list of hanja which may be registered for use in given names.

People with this name include:

Entertainers
Choi Jae-sung (born 1964), South Korean actor

Footballers
Kim Jae-sung (born 1983), South Korean midfielder in Thailand
Ko Jae-sung (born 1985), South Korean midfielder in Indonesia
Lee Jae-sung (footballer, born 1985), South Korean defender (formerly Jeonnam Dragons)
Lee Jae-sung (footballer, born 1988), South Korean defender (Jeonbuk Hyundai)
Lee Jae-sung (footballer, born 1992), South Korean midfielder (Jeonbuk Hyundai)

Other sportspeople
Yu Jae-seong (born 1960), South Korean long-distance runner
Jang Jae-sung (born 1975), South Korean freestyle wrestler
An Jae-sung (born 1985), South Korean tennis player
Lee Jae-sung (boxer) (born 1983), South Korean professional boxer
Jung Jae-sung (1982–2018), South Korean badminton player
Oh Jae-seong (born 1992), South Korean volleyball player

See also
List of Korean given names

References

Korean masculine given names